is a railway station on Kintetsu Railway's Kyoto Line located in Fushimi, Kyoto, Japan.

Lines

Kintetsu Railway
Kyoto Line

Building
The elevated station has two side platforms with two tracks.

Platforms

History

The location of the station was a site of former Fushimi Station on the government-run Nara Line railway. Since a reroute of the Nara Line to the present route (via Inari Station) in 1921, Fushimi Station had been a terminal of a freight branch until its closure about two months before the opening of the present station.

September 5, 1895 - The station opens as a station of Nara Railway
February 7, 1905 - Nara Railway merges into Kansai Railway
October 1, 1907 - Kansai Railway is nationalized
August 1, 1921 - The line between Kyoto and Fushimi closes; Fushimi Station survives as a freight station
September 3, 1928 - The freight line between Fushimi and Momoyama closes and Fushimi Station closes
November 15, 1928 - The station opens as a station of Nara Electric Railroad
October 1, 1963 - NER merges and the station becomes part of Kintetsu

Adjacent stations

References

External links

 Station Facilities and Service
 Station Map

Railway stations in Kyoto
Railway stations in Japan opened in 1895
Railway stations in Japan opened in 1928